Rescue Under Fire is a 2017 Spanish war film directed by Adolfo Martínez set in Afghanistan. It stars Ariadna Gil, Raúl Mérida, Roberto Álamo and Antonio Garrido.

Plot 

The plot dramatises a real August 2012 incident in Afghanistan north of Bala Murghab involving the rescue of a Spanish Army's wrecked Super Puma helicopter from the Taliban insurgency.

Cast

Production 
Rescue Under Fire was produced by Tornasol Films, Castafiore Films, Hernández y Fernández and Rescate AIE, and it had the participation of RTVE and Movistar+, support from the Spanish Ministry of Defence and Armed Forces, collaboration of ICAA and funding from ICO. It had a €5 million budget. It was shot in locations of the province of Almería (including the Tabernas Desert and the "Álvarez de Sotomayor" Military Base in Viator), the Madrid region (Colmenar Viejo) as well as in Tenerife (primarily indoor footage).

Release 
Distributed by eOne Films, the film was theatrically released in Spain on 10 March 2017.

Reception 
Andrea G. Bermejo of Cinemanía rated the film 3 out of 5 stars, considering the (military) film to be an oddity in a Spanish cinema currently ranging from the thriller to the comedy, also writing that the film manages to achieve "an accurate portrait of the military world that some will surely label as propagandistic and recruiting".

Marta Medina of El Confidencial assessed that Martínez "manages to choreograph and plan credible and exciting battles of a scale rarely seen in a Spanish production".

Raquel Hernández Luján of HobbyConsolas scored a 78 out of 100 points rating ("good"), praising the production design, the frenetic pace and the soundness of the characters.

Accolades 

|-
| align = "center" rowspan = "4" | 2018 || rowspan = "2" | 73rd CEC Medals || Best New Director || Adolfo Martínez ||  || rowspan = "2" | 
|-
| Best Music || Roque Baños || 
|-
| rowspan = "2" | 32nd Goya Awards || Best Original Song || "Rap Zona Hostil" by Fenyxxx and Roque Baños ||  || rowspan = "2" | 
|-
| Best Special Effects || Reyes Abades, Curro Muñoz || 
|}

See also 
 List of Spanish films of 2017

References 

Tornasol Films films
2017 war drama films
War in Afghanistan (2001–2021) films
Films shot in the Community of Madrid
Films shot in the province of Almería
Films shot in the Canary Islands
Spanish war drama films
2010s Spanish-language films
2010s Spanish films